Dunces and Dangers is a 1918 American film directed by Larry Semon.

Plot summary
A man and his wife are having trouble financially and barely have anything to eat. The grocer and butcher visit and, seeing that the couple cannot pay them, take things from their apartment. Next, a group of men arrive and the couple quickly lock the door to the room, put on disguises and escape to the roof though the window. After a series of incidents, they discover that the men are actually there to tell the man that he has inherited a fortune.

Cast
Larry Semon as Larry
Madge Kirby as Larry's Wife
William Hauber
Owen Evans
Pietro Aramondo
Frank Alexander

External links

1918 films
1918 comedy films
1918 short films
Vitagraph Studios short films
1910s English-language films
American black-and-white films
Silent American comedy films
American silent short films
American comedy short films
1910s American films